Santa Cristina Gherdëina is a Ladin comune (municipality) in South Tyrol in northern Italy, located about  east of the city of Bolzano. Its Saslong ski run is home of the Super-G and Downhill for men races in FIS Ski World Cup.

Geography

The municipality of Santa Cristina borders the following municipalities: Campitello di Fassa, Kastelruth, Villnöß, Urtijëi, San Martin de Tor and Sëlva.

History

Coat of arms
The escutcheon is argent and gules party per fess: the upper part is represented a deer. It is the family Coat of Arms of Primus von Dosses, which has since 1636, near the church of St. Cristina, organized a refectory for the poor. The emblem was adopted in 1969.

Society

Linguistic distribution
According to the 2011 census, 91.40% of the population speak Ladin, 4.41% Italian and 4.19% German as first language.

Demographic evolution

Notable people 

 Vincenzo Demetz (1911-1990) an Italian cross-country skier who competed in the 1936 Winter Olympics
 Inge Senoner (born 1940) an Italian alpine skier, competed in two events at the 1964 Winter Olympics
 Giustina Demetz (born 1941) an Italian former alpine skier, competed at the 1964 and 1968 Winter Olympics
 Giuseppe Ploner (born 1959) former Italian cross-country skier
 Michela Ponza (born 1979) retired Italian professional biathlete, lives in Santa Cristina Gherdëina
 Simona Senoner (June 13, 1993 – January 7, 2011) an Italian cross-country racer and ski jumper, lived in Santa Cristina Gherdëina

References

External links
 Homepage of the municipality

Municipalities of South Tyrol